Carmen Amezcua (born March 21, 1962) is a Mexican novelist and former actress.

Life

Born in Matamoros, Tamaulipas, Mexico, she holds a degree in Human Sciences from the Universidad del Claustro de Sor Juana. In the late 1970s she worked for the newspaper El Heraldo de México, until in 1980, she began her career as an actress in Grupo Televisa. She has published short stories and poems in the book Hourglass XIV. In addition, she was president of the National Commission of Inspection and Surveillance of the National Association of Actors and Senior Official of the same union between 2004 and 2010.

Filmography

Theatre

El enfermo imaginario
Cero y van tres
Una vejez tranquila
Don Juan Tenorio
El taller del orfebre
Vamos a contar mentiras
Cuando los hijos no vienen
Bodas de sangre
Romeo y Julieta
El avaro

References

External links 
 
 

1962 births
Living people
Mexican telenovela actresses
Mexican television actresses
Mexican film actresses
Mexican stage actresses
Mexican novelists
Mexican women novelists
Actresses from Tamaulipas
20th-century Mexican actresses
21st-century Mexican actresses
People from Matamoros, Tamaulipas